Heinrich Gebhard (July 25, 1878 in Sobernheim, Rhineland-Palatinate, Germany – May 5, 1963 in North Arlington, New Jersey, United States) was a German-American pianist, composer and piano teacher.

Performer
Gebhard was born in Sobernheim, Germany, but moved at the age of 10 with his parents to Boston, Massachusetts in the United States, where he studied piano and composition with Clayton Johns until 1895. He went to Vienna, Austria for four years, where he studied under Theodor Leschetizky, and returned to Boston in 1899. He made his piano debut in 1900 with the Boston Symphony Orchestra. He enjoyed a lengthy career as one of the notable American pianists of the early 20th century. Later in his career, he became a music teacher and taught a number of other famous pianists, most notably Leonard Bernstein. The composer Alan Hovhaness also studied with him.

Composer
Gebhard composed music for piano, chamber orchestra and symphony orchestra. His Fantasy for Piano and Orchestra was given its first performance by the New York Philharmonic on November 12, 1925, with the composer at the piano. Among Gebhard's other works are the symphonic poem, Across the Hills (1940), Divertimento for Piano and Chamber Orchestra (1927), Waltz Suite for two pianos, the song cycle, The Sun, Cloud and the Flower and numerous works for piano.

Gebhard's book, The Art of Pedaling, was published posthumously in 1963.

References and footnotes

1878 births
1963 deaths
German composers
German classical pianists
American composers
American male composers
American classical pianists
American male classical pianists
American music educators
German emigrants to the United States
People from the Rhine Province
People from North Arlington, New Jersey
Educators from New Jersey
Pupils of Theodor Leschetizky